Admiral Ushakov is a  of the Russian Navy. Previously she was named Besstrashny before being renamed in 2004.

Development and design 

The project began in the late 1960s when it was becoming obvious by the Soviet Navy that naval guns still had an important role particularly in support of amphibious landings, but existing gun cruisers and destroyers were showing their age. A new design was started, employing a new 130 mm automatic gun turret.

Construction and career 
Besstrashny was laid down on 6 May 1988 and launched on 19 January 1991 by Severnaya Verf in Leningrad. She was commissioned on 30 December 1993.

From 2000 to 2004, she underwent medium repairs in the city of Severodvinsk at the Zvezdochka TsS OJSC. In 2004, Besstrashny changed her name to Admiral Ushakov, patronage relations were established with the Republic of Mordovia.

On June 9, 2016, Admiral Ushakov conducted a live firing exercise in the Barents Sea, including practicing a battle with a mock enemy's surface ship, engaging fast-moving small targets and floating sea mines. The artillery complexes AK-130 and AK-630 were involved in the firing.

In May 2018, she conducted artillery fire at coastal targets. The exercise involved artillery systems of the main caliber two AK-130 artillery mounts. The gunners worked out the defeat of an invisible target on the shore at a distance of more than 10 kilometers. The vessel encountered serious propulsion problems in 2018 and was earmarked to be scrapped. However, it was then decided to instead repair the propulsion system, as well as replace some of the electrical systems. The vessel returned to service in August 2021 and took part in Zapad-21 exercise along with frigate Admiral Kasatonov.

Gallery

References 

1991 ships
Ships of the Soviet Union
Ships built at Severnaya Verf
Naval ships of the Soviet Union
Sovremenny-class destroyers